Vučkovec is a mineral spring in Međimurje County, northern Croatia, which from the early twentieth century served as the focus of a small resort community.

The healing power of the warm mineral water was known to local inhabitants living near the Vučkovec locality from the very beginning. The spring water showed measured temperature between 33 °C and 34 °C, remarkable balneological factors, high level of mineralization and presence of carbon dioxide.

In the mid-thirties of the twentieth century, Josip Kraljić, a businessman from the 15-kilometer-distant town of Čakovec, developed the resort at the location by building the first swimming pool. At the same time he established a bottle filling section for bottled drinking mineral water called „Vučkovec – mineral spring of Medjimurje“, that functioned until the Second World War. After the War the facility was nationalized and suffered stagnation.

New development occurred in 1996, after the Croatian War of Independence, as the whole area was included into a new-formed Sveti Martin na Muri municipality. Vučkovec was bought by the firm „Modeks“ Inc. from the neighbouring town of Mursko Središće and named „Toplice Vučkovec“ (English: Vuchkovets Spa). A new swimming pool was built, as well as dressing room, restaurant and other supporting facilities.

In 2003 a new company, „Toplice Sveti Martin“ Ltd., took over the location with all existing equipment and pushed strongly for the further development, investing in a new open-air and an indoor swimming pool, saunas, sunbeds, golf playgrounds and a new four-star hotel. So an attractive health, spa and sport resort, well known in the region, has been developed lately.

Besides the mineral spring, the name Vučkovec has been used for the neighbouring gas exploitation field, as well as for the water retention dam on the rambling Gradiščak brook, built for flood protection.

Further reading
 Waterfilter Alliance

External links
 Vučkovec – thermal and mineral water spring in Croatia
 Vučkovec as geothermal potential in south-east Europe – text from Aristotle University of Thessaloniki, Greece

Hot springs of Croatia
Spa waters
Tourist attractions in Međimurje County
Medical tourism
Destination spas
Landforms of Međimurje County